Myrna L. Bair (October 26, 1940) is an American politician and educator.

Bair served in the Delaware Senate for the 5th district of Delaware from 1980-2000 and is currently a Public Advisor and Assistant Professor in the Institute for Public Administration at the University of Delaware. Bair was born in Huntington, West Virginia. She received her B.S. degree in Chemistry from the University of Cincinnati and her Ph.D. in inorganic chemistry from the University of Wisconsin. Blair taught chemistry at Beaver College in Pennsylvania. She was elected as a Republican in 1980 to the Delaware Senate and represented the 5th District in north Wilmington and served until 2000. With an interest in children's issues, she was instrumental in the creation of the Office of the Child Advocate and the Department of Services for Children, Youth and Their Families in Delaware. She was inducted into the Hall of Fame of Delaware Women in 2011, won the “Women Who Make a Difference” Award from the International Women's Forum in 2000 and won the “Order of the First State” Award from Governor Thomas R. Carper in 2000.

References 

University of Cincinnati alumni
University of Wisconsin–Madison alumni
Women state legislators in Delaware
21st-century American politicians
21st-century American women politicians
Republican Party Delaware state senators
University of Delaware faculty
1940 births
Living people
Arcadia University faculty
Politicians from Huntington, West Virginia
People from Wilmington, Delaware
American women academics